Penicillium pulvis is a species of fungus in the genus Penicillium which was isolated from house dust in Kuils River, South Africa.

References

pulvis
Fungi described in 2014